Emma Amos may refer to:

 Emma Amos (actress) (born 1964), English actress 
 Emma Amos (painter) (1937–2020), American painter and printmaker